"Risk" is a science fiction short story by American writer Isaac Asimov, first published in the May 1955 issue of Astounding Science Fiction, and reprinted in the collections The Rest of the Robots (1964) and The Complete Robot (1982).

The story is a sequel to "Little Lost Robot". It is set in the same location, but involves a different positronic robot – one of the few in Asimov's stories to have neither a serial number nor nickname.

Plot summary
The researchers at Hyper Base are ready to test the first hyperspace ship. Previous experiments were successful in transportation of inert objects, but all attempts to transport living creatures have led to complete loss of higher brain function. As such, the ship has a positronic robot at the controls, since a robot is more expendable than a human, and its brain can later be precisely analyzed for errors to determine the cause. The ship fails to function as planned, and Susan Calvin persuades Gerald Black, an etherics engineer (who had also appeared in "Little Lost Robot"), to board the ship in order to locate the fault.

As Calvin suspects, Black finds that the fault lies with the robot, which, as a result of imprecise orders, has damaged the controls of the ship. They realize that the precise and finite robot mind must be compensated for by human ingenuity.

External links
 

Robot series short stories by Isaac Asimov
1955 short stories
Works originally published in Analog Science Fiction and Fact